George Sinkinson (25 November 1874 – 14 January 1939) was a Labour Party politician who served as the member of parliament (MP) for Berwick and Haddington.

Born in Kendal, Sinkinson later relocated to Edinburgh.  He served on Edinburgh Trades Council, and was also active in the Independent Labour Party, chairing its East of Scotland federation.

Sinkinson was elected at the general election of 1929, but lost his seat in the National Government landslide of 1931.

References

External links 
 

Members of the Parliament of the United Kingdom for Scottish constituencies
UK MPs 1929–1931
1874 births
1939 deaths
Independent Labour Party politicians
People from Kendal
Scottish Labour MPs